William Lord (February 13, 1841 – August 4, 1915) was a musician in the Union Army and a Medal of Honor recipient for his actions in the American Civil War.

Medal of Honor citation
Rank and organization: Musician, Company C, 40th Massachusetts Infantry. Place and date: At Drurys Bluff, Va., May 16, 1864. Entered service at. Lawrence, Mass. Birth: England. Date of issue. April 4, 1898.

Citation:

Went to the assistance of a wounded officer lying helpless between the lines, and under fire from both sides removed him to a place of safety.

Post-war
After the war, Lord invented a form of rubberized cloth. He was general manager of the Lyall Cotton Mills for 32 years, and later became chief inspector of Hartford Tire. He died in New York on August 4, 1915.

See also

 List of Medal of Honor recipients
 List of American Civil War Medal of Honor recipients: G–L

References

External links
 

English-born Medal of Honor recipients
1841 births
1915 deaths
United States Army Medal of Honor recipients
Union Army soldiers
English emigrants to the United States
American Civil War recipients of the Medal of Honor